Abril Zamora Peláez (born November 11, 1981 in Cerdanyola del Vallés, Barcelona) is a Spanish actress, screenwriter, and director with a long career in film, television, and theater. She rose to prominence as Luna in the FOX Spain television series Vis a Vis, which gave visibility to the LGBT+ reality through fiction.

Biography 
Abril Zamora Peláez was born in Cerdanyola del Vallés (Barcelona) on November 11, 1981.She made her gender transition visible through her personal social networks, and since then she has demanded both greater diversity in characters and more opportunities for the trans community in the audiovisual media. However, for her, it is also important to speak openly about her past, of which she is also proud. In 2018, she participated in the documentary directed by Fernando González Molina The Best Day of My Life, which shows six LGBT people who gather in Madrid for the celebration of International LGBT Pride Day and who dare to live as they are with pride, joy, and commitment. She also stated that she always knew she was a girl but did not identify with the trans label because gender does not really define her.

Career path 
She started acting when she was a teenager, playing King Arthur in a school play, Merlín el encantador. Together with Sergio Caballero, she set up the theater company Oscura Teatre, with which she made the plays El congelador (2008), La indiferencia de los armadillos (2009), and Todas muertas (2010), all three with text by Zamora. In 2014, she premiered the play Yernos que aman, a tragicomic choral story that she performed for four seasons at La Pensión de Las Pulgas in Madrid, directed by herself and in which she played one of the characters. In acting, she has played small roles in the television series Los Serrano (2007), Los hombres de Paco (2008), Hospital central (2009), La que se avecina (2014) and Anclados (2015). In addition to starring in the film Marica tú directed by Ismael Núñez and broadcast on Flooxer.

In April 2017, she began her transition, and it was then when she was offered a small role in the series Vis a vis, playing a girl with drug problems in a sequence; but on the test, she liked the team, and that nameless character grew and became Luna during the third and fourth seasons of the series. With this role, she gained more popularity and got a nomination for Best Newcomer Actress at the Actors and Actresses Union Awards.

In 2019, she created a series for Telecinco called Señoras del (h)AMPA, for which she was also director and screenwriter during its two seasons and which revolves around a group of mothers of an AMPA who kill a person by mistake. The same year, she joined the screenwriting team of the Netflix series Élite. She also participated in the film ¿A quién te llevarías a una isla desierta? by Jota Linares and, a year later, in the Italian film The Life Ahead, where she shared the screen with Sophia Loren. She also had a supporting role in the Netflix original series El desorden que dejas, where she played Tere, the best friend of Inma Cuesta's character. Her next project was as creator, director, and actress in the HBO Max series Todo lo otro, which premiered in October 2021 and tells the story of a group of friends in their thirties and the various issues that affect them.

Filmography

As director and screenwriter

As an actress

Cinema

Television

Awards and nominations

References 

LGBT in Spain
Spanish screenwriters
Spanish women film directors
21st-century Spanish actresses
Spanish stage actresses
Spanish television actresses
Spanish film actresses
Living people
1981 births